Steve Downing (born September 9, 1950) is an American retired basketball player.

A 6'8" center, Downing, along with teammate George McGinnis, led Indianapolis Washington High School to a 31–0 record and a state championship in 1969.  He went on to star at Indiana University, and won the Chicago Tribune Silver Basketball award in 1973 as the best player in the Big Ten Conference. Notable performances included the program's first triple-double: 28 points, 17 rebounds and 10 blocks in an 88–79 win over Michigan at the IU Fieldhouse on February 23, 1971; and 47 points and 25 rebounds in a 90–89 double-overtime victory over Kentucky on December 11, 1971.

Downing later played two seasons for the Boston Celtics of the National Basketball Association. He averaged 2.4 points per game in his professional career, and won an NBA Championship ring in 1974.

Currently Downing is the athletic director at Marian University in Indianapolis.

Notes

1950 births
Living people
American men's basketball players
Basketball players from Indianapolis
Boston Celtics draft picks
Boston Celtics players
Centers (basketball)
Indiana Hoosiers men's basketball players